Jeffrey Lynch is an American animator and graphic artist. His past work includes: animation director on The Simpsons and Futurama; assistant director on Spider-Man, Spider-Man 2, Spider-Man 3, and The Iron Giant as story department head.

Personal information
Lynch has been creating motion media ranging from TV commercial to corporate communications for almost 30 years. He has worked for a number of clients. Having worked in medical, education, technology, politics, fashion, and non-profit organizations, Lynch has directed actors and celebrities such as James Earl Jones and Martha Stewart.

In his career, Lynch has worked as a marketing strategist, director, photographer and musician.

Awards
International Film + TV Festival of New York
Telly awards and the Addys

Clients
Bristol-Myers Squibb
Sanofi-Synthelabo
Merck and Company
PinnacleHealth
Highmark
Lancaster Regional Medical Center
DuPont
Rohm and Haas
Armstrong
WoodMode
Graco
Broadband Networks
Cardinal Technologies
T. Rowe Price
Bank of Lancaster County
Elizabethtown College
Juniata College
The Philadelphia Orchestra
The Lancaster Symphony Orchestra
The Campaign Group
The Miss America Organization

Education
Lynch received his degree in documentary filmmaking from Temple University, while also attended the Robert Flaherty Film Seminar. He also worked for the Advertising and Marketing Services group at Armstrong. Armstrong is an interior furnishings manufacturer from Lancaster, Pennsylvania.

Directing credits

The Simpsons episodes
He is credited with directing the following episodes:

"Like Father, Like Clown"
"I Married Marge"
"Separate Vocations"
"Marge Gets a Job"
"Brother from the Same Planet"
"Whacking Day" 
"Boy-Scoutz 'n the Hood"
"Lisa vs. Malibu Stacy"
"The Boy Who Knew Too Much"
"Homer Badman"
"Who Shot Mr. Burns? (Part One)"
"Raging Abe Simpson and His Grumbling Grandson in 'The Curse of the Flying Hellfish'

Futurama episodes
He is credited with directing the following episodes:
"My Three Suns"
"Brannigan, Begin Again"

References

External links
 

Living people
American animators
American television directors
American animated film directors
Year of birth missing (living people)